Popowo-Parcele  is a village in the administrative district of Gmina Somianka, within Wyszków County, Masovian Voivodeship(province), in east-central Poland.

The village has a population of 100.

References

Popowo-Parcele